The 1995 Major Indoor Lacrosse League season is the 9th season of the league that began on January 7, 1995, and concluded with the championship game on April 8, 1995.

Team movement
1995 featured the debut of the Rochester Knighthawks to the MILL, replacing the Detroit Turbos.

Regular season

All Star Game
No All-Star Game was played in 1995.

Playoffs

* indicates an overtime period.

Awards

Weekly awards
Each week, a player is awarded "Player of the Week" honours.

Monthly awards
An award is also given out monthly for the best overall player.

All-Pro Teams
First Team:
Ted Dowling, Boston
Gary Gait, Philadelphia
Paul Gait, Rochester
John Tavares, Buffalo
Jim Veltman, Buffalo
Dallas Eliuk, Philadelphia (goalie)

Second Team:
 Thomas Carmean, Boston
Tim Hormes, Baltimore
Tom Marechek, Philadelphia
Bob Martino, Baltimore
Mark Millon, Baltimore
Steve Dietrich, Rochester (goalie)

Statistics leaders
Bold numbers indicate new single-season records. Italics indicate tied single-season records.

See also
 1995 in sports

References
1995 Archive at the Outsider's Guide to the NLL (via Internet Archive)

Mill
Major Indoor Lacrosse League seasons